François Arnaud may refer to:
François Arnaud (actor) (born 1985), Canadian actor
François Arnaud (ecclesiastic) (1721–1784), French ecclesiastic and academician